Petar Aleksić (born 2 November 1968) is a Bosnian-Swiss professional basketball coach and former player. He is the current head coach of Fribourg Olympic of the Swiss Basketball League (SBL).

From 2013 until 2016, he coached Switzerland's national basketball team, which he led to a surprise victory over Russia at the 2015 EuroBasket qualification.

As a professional player, he played in the Federal Republic of Yugoslavia, Hungary, Switzerland and Bosnia and Herzegovina. After his retirement as a player he won the Basketball Bundesliga (BBL) as assistant coach of Alba Berlin. He also coached BBC Feldkirch Baskets in Austria and several Swiss teams as head coach.

References

External links
EuroBasket.com Profile as coach and player
EuroBasket.com Profile as player

1968 births
Living people
Bosnia and Herzegovina men's basketball players
Bosnia and Herzegovina basketball coaches
Bosnia and Herzegovina expatriate basketball people in Serbia
KK FMP (1991–2011) players
KK Leotar players
People from Trebinje
Serbs of Bosnia and Herzegovina
Swiss people of Serbian descent
Swiss people of Bosnia and Herzegovina descent
Swiss men's basketball players
Forwards (basketball)